Graham County (county code GH) is a county located in the U.S. state of Kansas. As of the 2020 census, the county population was 2,415. Its county seat and most populous city is Hill City. The county is home to Nicodemus, founded 1877, which is the only remaining western town established by African Americans during the Reconstruction Period following the American Civil War.

History

Early history

For many millennia, the Great Plains of North America was inhabited by nomadic Native Americans.  From the 16th century to 18th century, the Kingdom of France claimed ownership of large parts of North America.  In 1762, after the French and Indian War, France secretly ceded New France to Spain, per the Treaty of Fontainebleau.

19th century
In 1802, Spain returned most of the land to France, but keeping title to about 7,500 square miles.  In 1803, most of the land for modern day Kansas was acquired by the United States from France as part of the 828,000 square mile Louisiana Purchase for 2.83 cents per acre.

In 1854, the Kansas Territory was organized, then in 1861 Kansas became the 34th U.S. state.  Graham County was organized in 1880.  In 1887, Graham County was established and named for Captain John L. Graham, a Union soldier killed in action at the Battle of Chickamauga in Tennessee on September 19, 1863.

Geography

Graham County roughly contains 3600 quarter sections, and is the fourth county east of Colorado line and the second county south of the Nebraska line. The 100th meridian west passes nearly through its center.
It is intersected by the south fork of Solomon River, and drained by Saline River.

Adjacent counties

 Norton County (north)
 Phillips County (northeast)
 Rooks County (east)
 Ellis County (southeast)
 Trego County (south)
 Gove County (southwest)
 Sheridan County (west)
 Decatur County (northwest)

National protected area
 Nicodemus National Historic Site

Demographics

As of the 2000 census, there were 2,946 people, 1,263 households, and 847 families residing in the county.  The population density was 3 people per square mile (1/km2).  There were 1,553 housing units at an average density of 2 per square mile (1/km2).  The racial makeup of the county was 94.91% White, 3.22% Black or African American, 0.34% Native American, 0.27% Asian, 0.03% Pacific Islander, 0.41% from other races, and 0.81% from two or more races. Hispanic or Latino of any race were 0.78% of the population.

There were 1,263 households, out of which 27.40% had children under the age of 18 living with them, 59.50% were married couples living together, 5.90% had a female householder with no husband present, and 32.90% were non-families. 30.10% of all households were made up of individuals, and 16.70% had someone living alone who was 65 years of age or older.  The average household size was 2.28 and the average family size was 2.84.

In the county, the population was spread out, with 22.50% under the age of 18, 5.30% from 18 to 24, 23.10% from 25 to 44, 25.40% from 45 to 64, and 23.70% who were 65 years of age or older.  The median age was 44 years. For every 100 females there were 95.10 males.  For every 100 females age 18 and over, there were 92.20 males.

The median income for a household in the county was $31,286, and the median income for a family was $38,036. Males had a median income of $26,642 versus $18,222 for females. The per capita income for the county was $18,050.  About 8.60% of families and 11.50% of the population were below the poverty line, including 13.60% of those under age 18 and 10.40% of those age 65 or over.

Government

Presidential elections

Laws
Following amendment to the Kansas Constitution in 1986, Graham County remained a prohibition, or "dry", county until 1992, when voters approved the sale of alcoholic liquor by the individual drink without a food sales requirement.

Education

Unified school districts
 Graham County USD 281

Communities

Cities
 Bogue
 Hill City
 Morland

Unincorporated communities
† means a Census-Designated Place (CDP) by the United States Census Bureau.
 Nicodemus†
 Penokee
 St. Peter

Ghost towns
 Fargo
 Happy
 Houston
 Kebar
 Millbrook
 Olean
 Roscoe
 Togo
 Turnerville
 Whitfield
 Wild Horse

Townships
Graham County is divided into thirteen townships.  None of the cities within the county are considered governmentally independent, and all figures for the townships include those of the cities.  In the following table, the population center is the largest city (or cities) included in that township's population total, if it is of a significant size.

In art
Noted regional artist Birger Sandzén frequently painted landscapes in Graham County, where his wife's parents moved in 1906. Examples include Still Water currently profiled in the collection at Kansas State University's Marianna Kistler Beach Museum of Art which depicts Wild Horse Creek in the county.

See also
 USS Graham County (LST-1176)

References

Notes

Further reading

 ; 156 pages; 2003.
 Standard Atlas of Graham County, Kansas; Geo. A. Ogle & Co; 61 pages; 1906.

External links

County
 
 Graham County - Directory of Public Officials
Historical
 Graham County Historical Society
Maps
 Graham County Maps: Current, Historic, KDOT
 Kansas Highway Maps: Current, Historic, KDOT
 Kansas Railroad Maps: Current, 1996, 1915, KDOT and Kansas Historical Society

 
Kansas counties
1887 establishments in Kansas
Populated places established in 1887